Gordon Island (Spanish: Isla Gordon) is an island in the Tierra del Fuego archipelago located between the Tierra del Fuego (Isla Grande) and the Hoste Island. It divides the Beagle Channel in two arms, the Northwest arm or Pomar Channel and the Southwest arm.

At the east end of the island is located the lighthouse Punta Divide.

See also
 
 List of islands of Chile
 Cabo de Hornos

External links
 Islands of Chile @ United Nations Environment Programme
 World island information @ WorldIslandInfo.com
 South America Island High Points above 1000 meters
 

Islands of Tierra del Fuego